Prorodes  is a genus of moths of the family Crambidae. It was described by Charles Swinhoe in 1894, with Prorodes mimica as type species.

Species
Prorodes camofelica Kirti & Kaur, 2009
Prorodes leucothyralis Mabille, 1900
Prorodes mimica C. Swinhoe, 1894

References

Spilomelinae
Crambidae genera
Taxa named by Charles Swinhoe